Evan P. Rutckyj (born January 31, 1992) is a Canadian professional baseball pitcher for the Niigata Albirex of the Baseball Challenge League. He was drafted by the New York Yankees in the 16th round of the 2010 Major League Baseball draft.

Career

New York Yankees
Rutckyj was drafted by the New York Yankees in the 16th round of the 2010 Major League Baseball draft out of St. Joseph's Catholic High School in Windsor, Ontario, Canada. Rutckyj spent the 2010 and 2011 seasons with the GCL Yankees. He split the 2012 season with the Low Single-A Staten Island Yankees and the Single-A Charleston River Dogs, registering an 8-8 record and 3.91 ERA with 86 strikeouts in 101.1 innings of work. He remained in Charleston for all of 2013, recording a 5.03 ERA and 10-9 record in 118.0 innings. He split the 2014 season between Charleston and the Advanced Single-A Tampa Yankees, pitching to an accumulative 5-3 record and 3.81 ERA with 58 strikeouts in 49.2 innings pitched. In 2015, Rutckyj spent time with Tampa and the Double-A Trenton Thunder, pitching to a 2.63 ERA with 82 strikeouts in 36 appearances.

Rutckyj was selected by the Atlanta Braves in the 2015 Rule 5 draft. On March 18, 2016, the Braves returned Rutckyj to the Yankees. Rutckyj only made 10 appearances in 2016, logging a 3.60 ERA with 13 strikeouts in 10.0 innings of work. Rutckyj began the 2017 season with Trenton, but after allowing 1 run in 0.2 innings pitched, he was released on May 1, 2017.

Winnipeg Goldeyes
On June 27, 2017, Rutckyj signed with the Winnipeg Goldeyes of the American Association of Independent Professional Baseball. In 22 games for Winnipeg, Rutckyj pitched to a 5.57 ERA with 21 strikeouts in 21.0 innings pitched.

Ottawa Champions
On January 31, 2018, Rutckyj was traded to the Ottawa Champions of the Can-Am League in exchange for a player to be named later. With Ottawa, Rutckyj registered a 5.64 ERA and 2-6 record with 65 strikeouts. He returned to Ottawa in 2019, appearing in 29 games and recording a 3.03 ERA with 53 strikeouts. He became a free agent following the season.

On November 22, 2019, Rutckyj signed with the Adelaide Giants of the Australian Baseball League for the 2019/2020 season.

Québec Capitales
On July 7, 2021, Rutckyj signed with the Québec Capitales, playing as Équipe Québec for the 2021 season, of the Frontier League. He would end up re-signing with the Capitales after the dissolution of Équipe Québec for the 2022 season.

Niigata Albirex
On April 3, 2022, it was announced that Rutckyj had signed with the Niigata Albirex of the Baseball Challenge League.

International career
In 2015, Rutckyj was selected to play for the Canada national baseball team at the Pan American Games.

Rutckyj also represented Canada at the 2019 Pan American Games Qualifier, the 2019 Pan American Games, the 2019 WBSC Premier12, and the 2023 World Baseball Classic.

References

External links

1992 births
Living people
Baseball people from Ontario
Baseball pitchers
Baseball players at the 2015 Pan American Games
Baseball players at the 2019 Pan American Games
Canada national baseball team players
Canadian expatriate baseball players in the United States
Charleston RiverDogs players
Gulf Coast Yankees players
Ottawa Champions players
Pan American Games gold medalists for Canada
Pan American Games medalists in baseball
Pan American Games silver medalists for Canada
Sportspeople from Windsor, Ontario
Staten Island Yankees players
Tampa Yankees players
Trenton Thunder players
Winnipeg Goldeyes players
2019 WBSC Premier12 players
2023 World Baseball Classic players
Medalists at the 2015 Pan American Games
Medalists at the 2019 Pan American Games
Canadian expatriate baseball players in Australia
Cañeros de Los Mochis players
Canadian expatriate baseball players in Mexico
Canadian expatriate baseball players in Japan